Virgisporangium is a genus of gram-positive bacteria. Virgisporangium are rod-shaped, motile, and form spores. They require oxygen to survive. They are generally found in the soil.

References 

Bacteria described in 2001
Micromonosporaceae
Bacteria genera